Agnes is a 2021 American horror drama film directed by Mickey Reece and starring Hayley McFarland as the titular character.

Premise
Rumors of demonic possession at a religious convent prompts a church investigation into the strange goings-on among its nuns. A disaffected priest and his neophyte are confronted with temptation, bloodshed and a crisis of faith.

Cast
Molly Quinn as Mary
Hayley McFarland as Agnes
Sean Gunn as Paul Satchimo
Rachel True as Sister Ruth
Chris Sullivan as Curly
Jake Horowitz as Hola
Chris Browning as Father Black
Ben Hall as Father Donaghue
Ginger Gilmartin as Wanda
Mary Buss as Mother Superior

Production
Filming occurred in Oklahoma and wrapped in February 2020.

Release
The film premiered at the Tribeca Film Festival on June 12, 2021.  In September 2021, it was announced that Magnet Releasing acquired North American distribution rights to the film, which was released theatrically and on demand on December 10, 2021.

Reception

Box office
In its opening weekend, Agnes earned $1,433 from five theaters. The film made $96 in its sophomore weekend from three theaters.

Critical response
 

Katie Rife of The A.V. Club wrote: “…those looking for straightforward supernatural chills would be better off watching whatever turns up when they search “exorcism” on Netflix… If, on the other other (sic), you’re tired of seeing the same old beats hit again and again in these kind of movies, Agnes provides idiosyncratic salvation." Shelagh Rowan-Legg of Screen Anarchy also gave the film a positive review and wrote, "Discordant and fascinating, bizarre and deeply affecting, Agnes marks an intriguing and strong step in Reece's filmography." Scott Weinberg of Thrillist ranked the film #32 of the 40 best horror films of 2021 and wrote, "The film starts out as a somewhat traditional "possessed nun" story, but about halfway through it makes a sharp left turn and becomes a compelling character study about how an innocent young woman must contend with a trauma she can't explain." Lorry Kikta of Film Threat rated the film an 8 out of 10 and wrote, "I can only hope that as Reece’s career progresses, he gets bigger budgets and better resources. His vision is certainly deserving of that, and this is just more proof of his talents." Jeannette White of Comic Book Resources gave the film a negative review and wrote, "Overall, it holds a lot of unfulfilled potential that could have benefited from a concrete theme."

References

External links
 
 

2021 films
2021 drama films
2021 horror films
2020s horror drama films
American horror drama films
Nunsploitation films
Religious horror films
2020s English-language films
2020s American films